Pismo Beach (Chumash: Pismuʔ) is a city in the southern portion of San Luis Obispo County, in the Central Coast area of California, United States. The estimated population was 8,072 at the 2020 census, up from 7,655 in the 2010 census. It is part of the Five Cities Area, a cluster of cities in that area of San Luis Obispo County. The "Five Cities" area historically is made up of Arroyo Grande, Grover City (now Grover Beach), Halcyon, Fair Oaks and Nipomo.

History

The Chumash people are the historic inhabitants of the region, with Indigenous peoples having lived along the California coast for at least 11,000 years. 
The name Pismo comes from the Chumash language word for tar, pismuʔ, which was gathered from tar springs in Price Canyon near Pismo Beach. The tar was a valuable product which the Chumash used to caulk their seagoing canoes, called tomol, which traveled along the coast and out to the Channel Islands. The first European land exploration of Alta California, the Spanish Portolá expedition, passed through the area, traveling up Price Canyon from Pismo Beach, where they camped on September 4, 1769. Franciscan missionary and expedition member Juan Crespí noted in his diary that they found a Chumash village near the creek.

Pismo Beach is located on the Rancho Pismo Mexican land grant made to José Ortega, grandson of José Francisco Ortega, in 1840. In 1846 José Ortega sold Rancho Pismo to Isaac Sparks. John Michael Price bought most of the rancho from Sparks. Price established the town of Pismo Beach in 1891. His homestead is now Price Historical Park. His home is a registered historical landmark. Pismo is known as the clam capital of the world. Nearly over 2.5 million people visit Pismo Beach.

The first wharf at Pismo was built in 1882, followed by a full-length pier built in 1924 that was financed and constructed by William Woodrow Ward, who allowed full use of it by the public.  After it suffered considerable storm damage, the pier was renovated again in 1985. Pismo State Beach is named for the city of Pismo Beach.

The neighborhoods of Shell Beach and Sunset Palisades were the site of a Chumash village, and significant archeological sites are located in both areas. Shell Beach became agricultural land, mostly pea fields. Developer Floyd Calvert bought and developed the area in 1926. At first it was a local resort area; after World War II it became primarily residential. Sunset Palisades, originally called Oilport, was the site of an oil refinery from 1907 until after World War II. It is now residential.

Clams
The Pismo clam was named for the long, wide beach where so many were once found,  once in such abundance that they were harvested with plows. Clamming once drew thousands of clammers to Pismo during low tides, and is still legal; however, due to over-harvesting by humans and the protected sea otter (which feasts on clams), few clams are to be found.

Pismo Beach adopted the name "Clam Capital of the World" in the 1950s, though this motto is no longer used. The city still holds the Clam Festival every October, complete with clam chowder competitions and a clam-themed parade.

At the southern end of Price Street upon first entering Pismo Beach is a gigantic concrete clam statue. The oldest surf shop on the Central Coast  (Pismo Beach Surf Shop) can be seen from the Pismo clam statue. The  shell of a Pismo clam (Tivela stultorum) is on display at the Pismo Beach Chamber of Commerce.

Geography

Pismo Creek enters the Pacific Ocean at Pismo Beach. The southern end of Pismo Beach runs alongside sand dunes, which are followed by eucalyptus trees that attract thousands of migrating monarch butterflies every November through February.

Meadow Creek is a short creek that runs through the Pismo Lake Ecological Reserve and hosts a variety of wildlife despite its urban surroundings, including beaver (Castor canadensis).

Climate
Pismo Beach has a warm-summer Mediterranean climate (Csb.) Despite the subtropical latitude (the same as Cape Hatteras, North Carolina,) summers are quite cool and the change in seasonal temperatures is quite small. The hardiness zone is 9b/10a, which is a full zone higher than Cape Hatteras.

Demographics

2010
The 2010 United States Census reported that Pismo Beach had a population of 7,655. The racial makeup of Pismo Beach was 6,976 (91.1%) White, 50 (0.7%) African American, 41 (0.5%) Native American, 203 (2.7%) Asian, 11 (0.1%) Pacific Islander, 170 (2.2%) from other races, and 204 (2.7%) from two or more races. There were 715 people (9.3%) of Hispanic or Latino origin of any race.

The Census reported that 7,642 people (99.8% of the population) lived in households, 13 (0.2%) lived in non-institutionalized group quarters, and 0 (0%) were institutionalized.

There were 3,834 households, out of which 619 (16.1%) had children under the age of 18 living in them, 1,710 (44.6%) were opposite-sex married couples living together, 267 (7.0%) had a female householder with no husband present, 102 (2.7%) had a male householder with no wife present.  There were 235 (6.1%) unmarried opposite-sex partnerships, and 39 (1.0%) same-sex married couples or partnerships. 1,372 households (35.8%) were made up of individuals, and 578 (15.1%) had someone living alone who was 65 years of age or older. The average household size was 1.99.  There were 2,079 families (54.2% of all households); the average family size was 2.55.

The population was spread out, with 1,020 people (13.3%) under the age of 18, 450 people (5.9%) aged 18 to 24, 1,555 people (20.3%) aged 25 to 44, 2,642 people (34.5%) aged 45 to 64, and 1,988 people (26.0%) who were 65 years of age or older.  The median age was 51.8 years. For every 100 females, there were 93.5 males.  For every 100 females age 18 and over, there were 91.4 males.

The homeowner vacancy rate was 2.5%; the rental vacancy rate was 9.6%.  4,658 people (60.8% of the population) lived in owner-occupied housing units and 2,984 people (39.0%) lived in rental housing units.

2000

As of the census of 2000, there were 8,551 people, 4,230 households, and 2,322 families residing in the city. The racial makeup of the city was 91.35% White, 0.60% African American, 0.71% Native American, 2.92% Asian, 0.06% Pacific Islander, 1.65% from other races, and 2.71% from two or more races. Hispanic or Latino people of any race were 6.89% of the population.

There were 4,230 households, out of which 17.4% had children under the age of 18 living with them, 45.1% were married couples living together, 6.4% had a female householder with no husband present, and 45.1% were non-families; 35.4% of all households were made up of individuals, and 16.0% had someone living alone who was 65 years of age or older. The average household size was 2.02 and the average family size was 2.58.

In the city, the population was spread out, with 15.3% under the age of 18, 6.5% from 18 to 24, 25.2% from 25 to 44, 28.4% from 45 to 64, and 24.5% who were 65 years of age or older. The median age was 47 years. For every 100 females, there were 93.1 males. For every 100 females age 18 and over, there were 92.3 males.

The median income for a household in the city was $46,396, and the median income for a family was $61,036. Males had a median income of $48,606 versus $30,189 for females. The per capita income made for the city was $30,835. About 6.3% of families and 9.0% of the population were below the poverty line, including 10.5% of those under age 18 and 4.8% of those age 65 or over.

The population had a wave of expansion starting in the 1980s, after completion of waste water treatment facilities expansion; this lack of infrastructure had previously limited population growth.

Economy

Top employers

According to the city's 2020 Comprehensive Annual Financial Report, the top employers in the city are:

Government
Incorporated on April 25, 1946, Pismo Beach is a general-law city governed by a five-member council. The city council consists of a mayor (who serves a two-year term) and four councilmembers (who serve four-year terms).  All five are elected at-large.

Education

 Shell Beach Elementary School
 Judkins Middle School

Infrastructure
Water is provided by a wells in the Santa Maria Groundwater Basin, Lopez Lake, and the State Water Project.

In popular culture
The city mentioned in the films Clueless and A Night at the Roxbury; the TV show United States of Tara; and the animated series Futurama (episode "Raging Bender"), Robot Chicken (episode "Rodiggity"), and The Critic (episode "Lady Hawke").

The W. C. Fields comedy The Bank Dick (1940), set in Lompoc, includes a character listed in the film's credits as "A. Pismo Clam".

In the 1957 Merrie Melodies short Ali Baba Bunny, Bugs Bunny and his traveling companion Daffy Duck emerge from a tunnel, with Bugs believing they have arrived at Pismo Beach "and all the clams we can eat".

In the TV movie Dragnet 1966 (1969), Bill Gannon (Harry Morgan) takes disability retirement and moves to Pismo Beach. After eight months and three weeks of eating Pismo Beach clam chowder, Bill's health returns, his teeth stop falling out, and he is able to be reinstated with the L.A.P.D. Explaining to Joe Friday (Jack Webb) the reason for his restored health, he states, "The clams, Joe. The clams."

In The Monkees TV series episode "The Wild Monkees" (aired November 13, 1967), Pismo Beach is mentioned a few times. Mike Nesmith states, "You remember the Massacre at Pismo Beach?" when told that the Black Angels motorcycle gang will be staying at the hotel where they are working. The rest of the group replies "Pismo Beach?"

In the movie Clueless (1995), reference is made to a fictitious "Pismo Beach disaster."

In the I Love Lucy TV series episode "Lucy Gets In Pictures" (aired February 21, 1955), Lucy (Lucille Ball) mentions Pismo Beach as one of the locations that she and her best friend, Ethel Mertz (Vivian Vance), want to visit.

Pismo Beach is mentioned in the Coen Brothers' film The Big Lebowski (1998). This shout-out inspired the title of the Labradford song "Up to Pizmo", from the band's 2001 album Fixed::Context.

References

External links

1946 establishments in California
Cities in San Luis Obispo County, California
Incorporated cities and towns in California
Populated coastal places in California
Populated places established in 1946
Clams